Anti-Japan War Online is a Chinese-produced video game.

This video game is sponsored by the Communist Youth League and puts the player in the role of a Chinese person fighting Japanese soldiers during the Second Sino-Japanese War. Although translated as "Anti-Japan War," the original Chinese characters of the game's title, 抗战, is the correct Chinese name for the Second Sino-Japanese War. The League has deemed the product a "patriotic game" and will not include an option for players to play as Japanese units. Players select from 17 Chinese characters from all walks of life; they must defend the country during the Second Sino-Japanese War. The game generated a great deal of attention from young Chinese gamers even before its release. Violence level is reduced and fighting is only shown in miniature form. In addition to this, killing other soldiers is prohibited in the game. The time frame depicted in the game is from 1937 to 1945.

See also
Anti-Japanese sentiment in China
Chinese nationalism

References

External links
Official website (Chinese)
PK1937 - Download Client Explanation
China gets gung ho with new war against Japan ... but only online - Guardian story

2008 video games
China-exclusive video games
Chinese-language-only video games
Computer wargames
Video games developed in China
Video games set in China
World War II video games
Propaganda video games
Windows games
Windows-only games